Shekoufeh Safari (born 7 March 1989) is an Iranian volleyball player from  Iran women's national volleyball team who plays for the Women's National Team and Zob Ahan Cultural and Sport Club. She is in the position of middle blocker.

References

1989 births
Living people
Iranian women's volleyball players
Sportspeople from Isfahan